The Minister-President of Thuringia, officially the Minister-President of the Free State of Thuringia, is the head of government of the German state of Thuringia. The position was re-established in 1990 after German reunification. The former districts Erfurt, Suhl, Gera and some adjacent areas of the Halle were incorporated into the new and re-established federal state of Thuringia.

The current Minister-President is Bodo Ramelow, heading a minority government between The Left, Social Democrats and the Alliance '90/The Greens. Ramelow succeeded Thomas Kemmerich in March 2020. Ramelow previously served as Minister-President from 5 December 2014 to 5 February 2020.

The office of the Minister-President is known as the State Chancellery, and is located in the capital of Erfurt, along with the rest of the cabinet departments.

Title 
The German title Ministerpräsident may be translated literally as Minister-President, although the state government sometimes uses the title Prime Minister in English.

List 

 Minister-President of the Free State of Thuringia
Political Party:

References

 
Ministers-President
Thuringia Minister-President
Thuringia